Microscale is defined at the micrometre level spanning 0.1–100μm.

Microscale may also refer to:

Microscale meteorology
Microscale chemistry
 Kolmogorov microscales
 Micro-scale heat exchangers
 Micro-scale fluidics
 Micro-scale reactor
 Microscale and macroscale models
 Micro-scale MOSFETs,  used in certain commercial products